Robert Anthony Borski Jr. (born October 20, 1948) is an American politician. He was a Democratic Party Congressman from the U.S. state of Pennsylvania from 1983 until 2003, representing the state's 3rd congressional district.

Borski was born in Philadelphia, Pennsylvania, and he graduated from the University of Baltimore in 1971. He was a member of the Pennsylvania state house of representatives from 1977 to 1982.

In 1982, he took on GOP Representative Charles F. Dougherty in the 3rd Congressional District, which had been renumbered from the 4th after the 1980 Census. 1982 was a rough year for Republicans due to a recession and Borski would be a beneficiary of the public discontent. He also was helped by some friendly redistricting that shifted some heavily Democratic wards to the 3rd. Borski scored a narrow victory of less than 3,000 votes—in the process, ousting the last Republican to represent a significant portion of Philadelphia in the House. The Borski-Dougherty battles would be fought out in this district three more times in 1992, 1998, and 2000 with Borski victorious each time.

In his 20 years in Congress, Borski rose to become the second-ranking Democrat on the Transportation and Infrastructure Committee.  He was generally classed as a liberal Democrat, but opposed abortion in most cases.

In 2002, the Republican-controlled State Legislature threw Borski a curve. Pennsylvania was due to lose two districts as a result of the 2000 United States Census, and the legislature dismantled his northeast Philadelphia district.  Borski's home was drawn into the Montgomery County-based 13th District of two-term Democrat Joe Hoeffel.  They expected that either Borski or Hoeffel would be bloodied from the resulting primary election. However, Borski decided not to run, instead retiring from Congress and allowing Hoeffel to avoid a costly primary campaign.

After retiring, Borski formed his own lobbying firm, Borski Associates. Governor Ed Rendell hired Borski in 2003 to help lobby for the state of Pennsylvania in Congress.

On October 10, 2002, Robert Borski was among the 81 House Democrats who voted in favor of authorizing the invasion of Iraq. In 2003, the post office where Borski's father once carried mail was renamed in his honor.

In 2010, Politics Magazine named him one of the most influential Democrats in Pennsylvania.

References

External links

 PA redistricting lawsuit
 

1948 births
Living people
University of Baltimore alumni
Democratic Party members of the Pennsylvania House of Representatives
Pennsylvania lobbyists
Politicians from Philadelphia
Democratic Party members of the United States House of Representatives from Pennsylvania
21st-century American politicians
Members of Congress who became lobbyists